Montréal–Jeanne-Mance was a former provincial electoral district in the Montreal region of Quebec, Canada that elected members to the Legislative Assembly of Quebec.

It was created for the 1939 election from parts of Maisonneuve, Montréal-Dorion and Montréal-Mercier electoral districts.  Its final election was in 1962.  It disappeared in the 1966 election and its successor electoral district was Jeanne-Mance.

Members of the Legislative Assembly
 Joseph-Émile Dubreuil, Liberal (1939–1948)
 George Guévremont, Union Nationale (1948–1952)
 Jean-Paul Noël, Liberal (1952–1956)
 Maurice Custeau, Union Nationale (1956–1962)
 Aimé Brisson, Liberal (1962–1966)

References
 Election results (National Assembly)
 Election results (QuebecPolitique.com)

Former provincial electoral districts of Quebec